Roots Tonic was the name of the three piece rock-reggae band best known as Matisyahu's backing band during live shows and studio recordings. The band was made up of Aaron Dugan (guitar and sounds), Josh Werner (bass and keyboard, also co-writes songs with Matisyahu), and Jonah David (drums and percussion). They have recorded two studio albums  and a live album with Matisyahu, but the name Roots Tonic was first mentioned on the inside cover of Matisyahu's 2006 major label album Youth and its dub version, Youth Dub. 

Youth producer Bill Laswell was so impressed with the band that he invited it to record a dub album with him. The result, Roots Tonic meets Bill Laswell, was released in mid-2006 on Reach Out International Records.

In 2007, first Jonah David, and shortly after Josh Werner left Matisyahu's live band, which meant the end of Roots Tonic as well.

In 2009/2010, Dub Trio became Root Tonic's successor to support Matisyahu live on stage.

In 2011, Bill Laswell and Josh Werner produced Lee "Scratch" Perry's studio album "Rise Again"; Aaron Dugan plays guitar on select tracks.

Album discography

Solo

with Matisyahu

External links 
myspace page

American reggae musical groups
Jewish musical groups